Helene Whitney (born Kenyon Fortescue, July 4, 1914 – March 28, 1990) was an American actress who appeared in films in the late 1930s and 1940s. She was known as Helene Reynolds after her marriage.

Biography
Whitney was born Kenyon Fortescue in 1914, but was known as Helene. Through her mother, Grace Fortescue, she was a grandniece (and cousin twice removed) of Alexander Graham Bell, who invented the telephone. 
Through her father Granville Roland Fortescue, she was a first cousin once removed of US President Theodore Roosevelt.

She grew up in Washington D.C. where she attended the National Cathedral School for Girls. She married Julian Louis Reynolds, son of Richard S. Reynolds, Sr. and heir to the Reynolds aluminum and tobacco fortunes, on July 15, 1936, in Washington, becoming Helene Fortescue Reynolds. After three years of marriage, they divorced in May 1939.

She became an actress, using the stage names of Joyce Gardner, Helene Whitney and Helene Reynolds, appeared in films in the late 1930s and 1940s and later in stage productions. After her acting career ended, she became a Manhattan art gallery proprietor and artist in the 1960s. She died of pneumonia at the John F. Kennedy Medical Center in Atlantis, Florida aged 75 on March 28, 1990.

Filmography
As Helene Whitney/Helen Whitney

As Helene Reynolds

Television
As Helene Reynolds

Stage
Oh, Captain! (February 4, 1958 – July 19, 1958)
Happy Hunting (December 6, 1956 – November 30, 1957)
Call Me Madam (October 12, 1950 – May 3, 1952)
Miss Liberty (July 15, 1949 – April 8, 1950)
High Button Shoes (October 9, 1947 – July 2, 1949)
Yours Is My Heart (September 5, 1946 – October 5, 1946)

Family tree

References

External links

1914 births
1990 deaths
20th-century American actresses
20th-century American singers
20th-century American women singers
American film actresses
American musical theatre actresses
American people of Dutch descent
Deaths from pneumonia in Florida
National Cathedral School alumni
Roosevelt family
Schuyler family